Burrel may refer to:
 Burrel, Albania, city in northern Albania
 Burrel, California, unincorporated community in Fresno County, California
 Rey Za Burrel, Gundam character

See also 
 Burrell